Chenar-e Bala (also Romanized as Chenār-e Bālā; also known as Chenār-e ʿOlyā Āzādbakht) is a village in Kuhdasht-e Jonubi Rural District, in the Central District of Kuhdasht County, Lorestan Province, Iran. At the 2006 census, its population was 339, in 65 families.

References 

Towns and villages in Kuhdasht County